The Volhynia Experiment was a cultural and political program by the interwar Polish government in the province of Volhynia whose purpose was to create a Ukrainian identity that was also loyal to the Polish state. It was hoped that this program would furthermore lead to pro-Polish sympathies in Soviet Ukraine and serve as a potential aid to Polish plans concerning the Soviet Union. The Volhynia Experiment was opposed both by Ukrainian nationalists from neighboring Galicia and by pro-Soviet communists.

History
   

In 1928 Henryk Józewski, the former deputy minister for internal affairs in the Ukrainian government of Symon Petliura, was named voivode, or governor, of Volhynia, to carry out the program of cultural and religious autonomy for Ukrainians in that region. Józewski, a Pole from Kiev (where, unlike in Galicia, Poles and Ukrainians had a history of cooperating with one another), was a Ukrainophile who felt that the Polish and Ukrainian nations were deeply connected and that Ukraine might one day become a "Second fatherland" for Poles. 

Józewski brought Ukrainian followers of Symon Petliura, including former officers in Petliura's army, to his capital, Lutsk, to help his Volhynian administration. He hung portraits of Petliura and Piłsudski together in public places, founded an Institute for the Study of Nationality Affairs and an educational society for the Orthodox (which expanded to 870 chapters in Volhynia), subsidized a Ukrainian reading society (which by 1937 had 5,000 chapters), and sponsored Ukrainian theater. The use, in church sermons, of the Ukrainian language instead of Russian, was encouraged.

A loyalist Ukrainian political party, the Volhynian Ukrainian Alliance, was created. This party was the only Ukrainian political party allowed to freely function in Volhynia. Its program called for democracy, separation of church and state, and equality for all citizens.  Though many of its supporters, former officers of Symon Petliura, had committed anti-Jewish pogroms in Volhynia during the  Revolution, under Józewski's influence antisemitism was not tolerated. 
  
Two groups competed with Józewski and his pro-Polish Ukrainian allies for the allegiance of the Volhynian Ukrainians: the Communist Party of Western Ukraine and the Organization of Ukrainian Nationalists (OUN), based in Galicia.  The Communists referred to the Volhynian Experiment as a "Petliurite Occupation", and set up a front party, the Peasant Worker Alliance.  The Peasant Worker Alliance, whose affiliation with the Communist party was unknown by most of its supporters, grew to be the most popular party in Volhynia, until it was banned by Józewski in 1932. Soviet-based partisans fought Józewski's police in the marshes of northern Volhynia.   
        
While the Communists were coming to Volhynia from the East, Ukrainian nationalists entered from the South. The OUN saw Volhynia as fertile ground for the expansion of its Ukrainian nationalist ideal. By 1935 it was reported that 800 OUN members were operating in Volhynia; they had penetrated many of the Ukrainian institutions that Józewski had created. According to Józewski's rivals in the Polish military, the pro-Polish Petliurite Ukrainians in Volhynia failed to match the OUN in terms of organization and numbers.

During the period of his governance, Józewski was the object of two assassination attempts: by Soviet agents in 1932 and by Ukrainian nationalists in 1934.

Cancellation of the Volhynia Experiment

After his sponsor Pilsudski's death in 1935, Józewski's Ukrainian programme was cancelled. The anti-Ukrainian Polish elements in the Polish military took control over policies in Volhynia.  Józewski was criticized for allowing Ukrainians to buy land from Poles, Orthodox churches were demolished or converted to Catholic use during the "revindication" campaign, and by 1938 Józewski himself lost his post. Under his successor, all state support for Ukrainian institutions was eliminated, and it was recommended that Polish officials cease using the words "Ukraine" or "Ukrainian." The Polish army Generals believed that filling all state offices in Volhynia with ethnic Poles would ensure fast mobilization and prevent sabotage in case of a Soviet attack on Poland. Ukrainians were systematically denied the opportunity to obtain government jobs. Although the majority of the local population was Ukrainian, virtually all government official positions were assigned to Poles. Land reform designed to favour the Poles brought further alienation of the Ukrainian population.

Military colonists were settled in Volhynia to defend the border against Soviet intervention.
Despite the ethnic Ukrainian lands being overpopulated and Ukrainian farmers being in need of land, the Polish government's land reforms gave land from large Polish estates not to local villagers but to Polish colonists. This number was estimated at 300,000 in both Galicia and Volhynia by Ukrainian sources and less than 100,000 by Polish sources (see osadnik).

Plans were made for a new round of colonization of Volhynia by Polish military veterans and Polish civilians and hundreds of new Roman Catholic churches were planned for the new colonists and for converts from Orthodoxy.

Volhynia after the Experiment

The ultimate result of Polish policies in Volhynia was that a sense of Ukrainian patriotism was created; however this patriotism was not tied to the Polish state. As a result of the anti-Ukrainian Polish policies that followed the Polish government's cancellation of the Volhynian Experiment, both Ukrainian nationalists and Communists found fertile ground for their ideas among the Volhynian Ukrainian population.

References

Ethnic groups in Poland
Ethnic groups in Ukraine
1928 establishments in Poland
20th century in Ukraine
Poland–Ukraine relations
History of Volhynia